The Repulse Bay is a residential building and commercial arcade, located at 109 Repulse Bay Road in the Repulse Bay area of Hong Kong. It is owned by The Hongkong and Shanghai Hotels, Limited (HSH) and operated by Peninsula Properties, a subsidiary of HSH.

History
The Repulse Bay occupies the site of the former colonial-style Repulse Bay Hotel (1920-1982), which was featured in the 1978 film Coming Home. The writer Eileen Chang arranged the leading male and female characters to meet here in her novel Love in a Fallen City.

The hotel was renowned for its British architectural style and was owned by Hongkong and Shanghai Hotels group of the Kadoorie family. During World War II it was used as a stronghold and a hospital by the British forces.

Royalty and celebrities who found refuge at the hotel include writers George Bernard Shaw and Noël Coward. Actor Marlon Brando was a guest in the 1950s. Spain's Crown Prince Juan Carlos and Crown Princess Sofia spent their honeymoon there while other royal guests included Prince Axel of Denmark and Prince Peter of Greece.

The Repulse Bay Hotel was demolished in 1982 for redevelopment of the site. A replica of the original lobby building of the hotel was built on the site in 1986. A sequence in Ang Lee's 2007 film of Eileen Chang's novel Lust, Caution was filmed in the restaurant.

Features
The present building is 37 floors high at its tallest. It comprises four towers, with the size of apartments ranging from 91 to 545 m2. The four towers are named "Taggart", "Hartson", "Nicholson", and "De Ricou", after persons associated with the original Hotel. De Ricou tower is LEED certified and comprises 15 serviced apartments and was fully refurbished in 2012-2013.

The building is known for its square "hole", purportedly added for feng shui purposes. It received a silver medal at the 1989 Hong Kong Institute of Architects Annual Awards.

The Repulse Bay has two restaurants: The Verandah and Spices.

See also
 Private housing estates in Hong Kong

References 

Repulse Bay
Private housing estates in Hong Kong
1920 establishments in Hong Kong

External links
 The Repulse Bay Official Website